The Big Bang is a Milestone Comics event published by DC Comics. The event was first chronicled in Blood Syndicate #1 by Dwayne McDuffie, Ivan Velez Jr. and Denys Cowan, and Static #1 (April 1993) by Dwayne McDuffie and Robert L. Washington III.

Publication history
The Big Bang is a significant event in the fictional history of Milestone Comics, in which many of the superheroes and supervillains of Dakota - including Static and the Blood Syndicate - got their powers. The concept was the brainchild of Christopher Priest, who cites African-American urban legends as the inspiration.

The event took place on Paris Island, which had long suffered from heated gang wars. In 1993, the leaders of each gang decided to settle their grievances once and for all in a massive "gang bang" confrontation dubbed the "Big Bang". Word of the confrontation eventually reached Dakota's police department. Mayor Jefferson ordered them to spray every gang member present with an experimental tear gas laced with a radioactive marker that would allow the police to track the participants down later. The mayor was hoping that this would boost her reputation for being "tough on crime".

The gas also contained a mutagenic compound called "quantum juice" (or "Q-juice"). Most of those exposed to it - police included - died on the spot. The rest mutated, some being deformed, some gaining unusual abilities in the process. Others not personally involved in the conflict also became mutated as well. The survivors were dubbed "bang babies". The mayor disavowed any involvement. The survivors went on to become superheroes and supervillains that continued to roam the city of Dakota for years to come. The survivors of two gangs - the Paris Bloods and Force Syndicate - formed the core of the Blood Syndicate, a gang of bang babies which claimed Paris Island as their turf. The citizens of Dakota demanded the mayor to solve the Bang Babies problem and wanted to know where gas came from, but the mayor didn't give them a straight answer due to her involvement.

In other media
In the animated series Static Shock, the Big Bang is described through a flashback narrated by Virgil. A confrontation between two gangs (one led by Francis "F-Stop" Stone, the future Hot-Streak, the other led by Wade, a gang-leader looking to recruit Virgil into his crew, which is why Virgil is present at the skirmish) takes place in a restricted area on the docks. The fighting attracts the attention of the police, who arrive in helicopters and call for the gang members to drop their weapons. As the gang members run, one of them shoots out the helicopter searchlight. The police respond by shooting a tear gas grenade into the area. The canister hits bio-hazard marked barrels and ignites them, covering the area with mutagenic gas. The gang members and anyone else nearby (a common plot device in the show is introducing formerly unseen victims of the Big Bang) gain various powers from it and become known as "Bang Babies". Like in the comics, the people in Dakota demanded the mayor to solve the problem, but the mayor didn't give them a straight answer because she knew the gas came from Edwin Alva Sr. It was later revealed that Edwin Alva Sr. had planned for the Big Bang to go off.

In "Flashback", Ebon finds himself in the past and attempts to set off an earlier (and much larger) Big Bang during a previous gang war, "The Dakota Riots", in the hopes of having a much larger criminal empire to run upon his return. He is stopped by Static, Gear, and Time-Zone.

In "Power Outage", a cure for the mutagenic gas is developed and secretly administered to every resident in Dakota. By the order of the government, Dr. Todd sprayed the cure city-wide, to ensure that every Bang-Baby was exposed, including Static and Gear. Another reason was that the government saw the Bang-Babies as a too-big of a threat and crimes were committed by them. Dr. Todd didn't want to cure Static and Gear because of their heroics, but did-so anyway because most Bang-Babies were using their powers to commit crimes. This results in every Bang Baby, Static and Gear included, losing their powers. Ebon steals the last canister of the gas Dr. Todd's team used to create the cure, intending to use it to restore the powers of a choice few criminals. He and Hot-Streak come to blows over the canister, breaking the seal in the process. It's not made clear how many people were exposed, as the gas never escaped the ship and there were less than a dozen people present at the time. At the very least, Ebon, Hot-Streak, Gear, and Static were re-exposed to the gas, returning their powers. Since the gas is set off inside the enclosed-spaces of the corridors of a ship, the concentration apparently boosts their powers as well. Ebon and Hot-Streak overdose on the substance, fusing into a two-headed Bang Baby, "Ebon-Streak", with the combined powers of both men. The creature was taken down by Static blasting it off the ship, but it's unknown if the creature still lives under the waters of Dakota.

Notable bang babies 
 Aquamaria
 Blood Syndicate
 Ebon (Static Shock animated series and Milestone Returns)
 Gear
 Francis Stone/F-Stop/Hot-Streak ("Biz Money B"/"Biz Money G" in the comics)
 Rubber-Band Man
 Static
 Talon (Static Shock animated series and Milestone Returns)
 Shiv (Static Shock animated series and Milestone Returns)

See also
 Metahuman

References

1993 in comics
Milestone Comics storylines
Static Shock